The Best of Mind/Body: Electro-Industrial Music From the Internet is a various artists compilation album released on May 2, 1995, by Fifth Colvmn Records.

Reception

AllMusic awarded The Best of Mind/Body four and a half out of five stars and said "this industrial/electronica compilation, previously released on Atomic Novelties, was culled from tracks distributed through the Internet." Sonic Boom noted that "a wide variety of experimental music is featured so if you don't already have the RMI Mind/Body compilation CD's you might want to check out some of the unsigned talent featured here."

Track listing

Personnel
Adapted from The Best of Mind/Body: Electro-Industrial Music From the Internet liner notes.

 Zalman Fishman – executive-producer
 Andre Knecht – mastering

Release history

References

External links 
 The Best of Mind/Body: Electro-Industrial Music From the Internet at Discogs (list of releases)

1995 compilation albums
Fifth Colvmn Records compilation albums